Sebastian Giustinian (1460-1543) was a sixteenth-century Venetian diplomat.

Between 1515 and 1519, during the reign of Henry VIII of England, Giustinian was the Venetian ambassador to England.

References

1460 births
1543 deaths
People of the Tudor period
16th-century Venetian people
Ambassadors of the Republic of Venice to England
16th-century Italian diplomats